Into the Maelstrom or Descent Into the Maelstrom may refer to:

"A Descent into the Maelström", a short story by Edgar Allan Poe 
Into the Maelstrom (Dungeons & Dragons)
Into the Maelstrom, a 2005 sci-fi film directed by Peter Sullivan, part of the 48 Hour Film Project with Eric Etebari

Music

Albums
Into the Maelstrom (album), album by Bigelf (2014)
"Into the Maelstrom", song by A Band of Orcs (2007)
Descent into the Maelstrom, album by Lennie Tristano (1952)
Descent into the Maelstrom, album by Cultus Sabbati (2011)
Solo: A Descent Into the Maelstrom, album by Chris Cutler (2001)

Songs
"Into the Maelstrom", song by the Redwalls from The Redwalls (album)
"Descent into the Maelström", song by the progressive rock band  Crack from their album Si Todo Hiciera Crack (1979)
"Descent into the Maelstrom", song by Radio Birdman from Radios Appear
"Ascent into the Maelstrom", song by Evoken from Embrace the Emptiness